Linton Garner (March 25, 1915 in Greensboro, North Carolina – March 6, 2003 in Vancouver) was a jazz pianist. He was Erroll Garner's older brother.

Biography
As a youngster he was keener to play cornet than piano, but due to problems with his teeth, was forced to concentrate on the keyboard. From the age of 8 until 10 he had piano lessons, as did his three sisters (Martha, Ruth and Berniece), unlike his brother Erroll.

He was arranger and pianist with Fletcher Henderson's band before the Second World War, then spent 1943 to 1946 in the army, where he played both piano and trumpet in different bands. Afterwards he was pianist and arranger for a number of distinguished bands including those of Billy Eckstine and Dizzy Gillespie. He also accompanied Sarah Vaughan, Nat King Cole, Carmen McRae and Della Reese. He also wrote songs, including "You're the One For Me."

He moved to Canada in 1963. In 1974, Arni May invited him to Vancouver to accompany him at the opening of the Richmond Inn Hotel. Linton stayed in Vancouver and worked in many venues.  He was resident pianist for seven years at the Four Seasons Hotel. In the 1990s he played at the Three Greenhorns in Vancouver.  He also sang and played the piano in Rossini's restaurant in Kitsilano.

The Linton Garner Legacy Quartet, featuring drummer Don Fraser, bassist Russ Botten pianist Ron Johnston, pianist Miles Black continues to play Garner's music.

He died of kidney failure in Vancouver at the age of 87.

External links

 Biography at vancouverjazz.com

Bebop pianists
Swing pianists
1915 births
2003 deaths
Musicians from Greensboro, North Carolina
20th-century American pianists
Jazz musicians from North Carolina
American male pianists
20th-century American male musicians
American male jazz musicians